Lynden Pindling International Airport , formerly known as Nassau International Airport, is the largest airport in the Bahamas and the largest international gateway into the country. It is a major hub for Bahamasair, Western Air, and Pineapple Air. the airport is located in western New Providence island near the capital city of Nassau. The airport is named after Lynden Pindling, 
the first prime minister of the Bahamas.

History

Early years

In August 1942, No. 111 (Coastal) Operational Training Unit RAF was established at Nassau Airport to train general reconnaissance crews using the North American Mitchell and Consolidated Liberators.

During the Second World War, on 30 December 1942, the airport was named Windsor Field (after the Duke of Windsor) and became a Royal Air Force (RAF) station. Windsor Field was the second airport in The Bahamas and was used for delivery flights of US-built fighter and bomber aircraft such as the Boeing B-17 and Consolidated B-24 bombers, and the Curtiss P-40 fighter from the aircraft manufacturers to the North African and European theaters. It was also a base station for Consolidated Liberator I and  Mitchell patrol bombers combating the German Navy's U-boat threat.

111 OTU returned to the UK in August or September 1945. (National Archives) and was disbanded.

After the Second World War, on 1 June 1946, the RAF withdrew from Windsor Field and it reverted to civilian use. Oakes Field (now Thomas Robinson Stadium) remained as the main airport in the Bahamas due to its close proximity to downtown Nassau. At the Regional Caribbean Conference of the International Civil Aviation Organization held in Washington in September, 1946, Oakes Field was recommended for designation as a long range regular airport. Oakes International Airport was kept in operation until midnight, 1 November 1957, when Nassau International Airport at Windsor Field was brought into full operation.

The name of the airport was officially changed on 6 July 2006 in honour of The Rt Hon. Sir Lynden Pindling (22 March 1929 – 25 August 2000), first Prime Minister of Bahamas (1967 – 1992). Sir Lynden is recognized as the Father of the Nation, having led the Bahamas to Majority rule in 1967 as well as full Independence from the United Kingdom within the British Commonwealth six years later.

Expansion and renovations
With more than 3 million passengers and over 80,000 takeoffs and landings, the airport had reached its capacity by 2011 and its facilities were outdated and insufficient. In 2006, Nassau Airport Development Company (NAD) entered a 10-year management agreement with YVR Airport Services Ltd. (YVRAS), the commercial arm of Vancouver Airport Authority, to manage, operate and redevelop the airport.

The redevelopment updated the airport facilities to international standards and expanded terminal capacity. The work was carried out in three stages. The first stage included the design and construction of a new  U.S Departures Terminal, at a cost of $198.1 million. Stage 2 consisted of the complete renovation of the current U.S terminal, to serve as the new U.S/International Arrivals Terminal, with a budget of $127.9 million. Stage 3 involved the design and construction of a new  domestic arrivals and departures terminal, as well as an International Departures Terminal at the location of the existing International Arrivals Hall. This last stage cost $83.5 million.

The financing had to be restructured and therefore slightly delayed because of the turmoil on financial markets in the wake of the Bankruptcy of Lehman Brothers. Nevertheless, the first stage of the project was completed in March 2011. The third and final phase of the project was completed in October 2013. The airport now features 10 jet bridge capable gates. Other features include four gates capable of taking Boeing 747-sized aircraft and one capable of handling the Airbus A380, the world's largest airliner. An additional 1 million square feet of airport operating surface has been added. There are also 24 new retail outlets and 16 bars and lounges located across the sprawling terminal complex.

The airport handled 3.2 million passengers in 2008; and it is expected that the expansion will allow for roughly 5.2 million passengers to be processed by 2020, according to NAD. The airport contains US Border preclearance facilities allowing all US flights to operate as domestic flights upon arrival at their destination. In February 2015, the US Border Preclearance Facility installed 20 Automated Passenger Control (APC) self serve kiosks to improve the efficiency of passenger processing for US bound travelers.

Airlines and destinations

Passenger

Cargo

Statistics

Operations
The airport had the highest Turnaround Costs (landing, boarding bridge, passenger facility charge, security, measured on an Airbus A320) of Latin American airports in 2009.

See also
List of the busiest airports in the Caribbean

References

17. File: https://nassaulpia.com/lpia-ends-2019-with-a-record-4-1-million-passengers-and-revenue-growth File: https://nassaulpia.com/wp-content/uploads/2020/01/NAD-2019-Annual-Report_.pdf

External links

Official website

Buildings and structures in Nassau, Bahamas
Airports in the Bahamas
Airports with United States border preclearance
Airfields of the United States Army Air Forces Air Transport Command on Atlantic Ocean islands
Space Shuttle Emergency Landing Sites